Samuel Graveson (1868–1957) was a British printer and philatelist who was added to the Roll of Distinguished Philatelists in 1948.

Graveson was a specialised in British postal history and editor of the Postal History Society Bulletin from 1936 to 1947.

Selected publications
Ocean Penny Post.

References

Signatories to the Roll of Distinguished Philatelists
1868 births
1957 deaths
British philatelists
British printers